The 1909 Southern Intercollegiate Athletic Association football season was the college football games played by the member schools of the Southern Intercollegiate Athletic Association as part of the 1909 college football season.  The season began on September 25.

Under head coach Harris G. Cope, Sewanee won its last conference title in major college football. Sewanee gave Vanderbilt its first loss to a Southern team in six years, and was the first Sewanee squad to win a title since the 1899 Iron Men.

When the Kentucky team was welcomed home after the upset win over Illinois, Philip Carbusier said that they had "fought like wildcats", a nickname that stuck.

President Taft showed up for the Sewanee-LSU game. LSU was led by Hall of Fame quarterback Doc Fenton.

Results and team statistics

Key

PPG = Average of points scored per game
PAG = Average of points allowed per game

Regular season

SIAA teams in bold.

Week One

Week Two

Week Three

Week Four

Week Five

Week Six

Week Seven

Week Eight

Week Nine

Week Ten

Bowl games

Awards and honors

All-Southern team

John Heisman's All-Southern team included:

References